Chun Wai Chan is a principal ballet dancer with New York City Ballet. Chan is a former principal dancer with Houston Ballet.

Early life and education 
Chun Wai Chan was born in Guangdong, China, and had his ballet education at Guangzhou Art School from 2004 to 2010. Chan was a finalist at the Prix de Lausanne 2010. As a finalist, he earned a full scholarship to study at Houston Ballet Academy from 2010 to 2012.

Career 
Chan joined Houston Ballet as a member of the corps de ballet in 2012. He was promoted to principal dancer with Houston Ballet in 2017.

Chan joined New York City Ballet as a soloist in August 2021. Chan got promoted to principal dancer with New York City Ballet on May 20, 2022.

References 

People from Guangdong
21st-century ballet dancers
Chinese ballet dancers
Chinese male ballet dancers
Houston Ballet principal dancers
New York City Ballet soloists
Living people
1992 births